Thomas Schmeck Flood (April 12, 1844 – October 28, 1908) was a United States Representative from New York.

Born in Lodi, New York, Flood attended the common schools and Elmira Free Academy. He studied medicine but did not practice, instead engaging in the drug business. He moved to Pennsylvania and founded the town of DuBois, then served as the town's first postmaster. After returning to New York, he settled in Elmira and served on the city's Board of Aldermen in 1882 and 1883. He engaged in agricultural pursuits and lumbering and was president of the Chemung County Agricultural Society in 1884 and 1885.

Flood was elected as a Republican to the Fiftieth and Fifty-first Congresses (March 4, 1887 – March 3, 1891). He served as chairman of the Committee on Expenditures on Public Buildings during the Fifty-first Congress. He was not a candidate for renomination in 1890.

Following his time as a Representative, Flood worked in the real estate business. He died on October 28, 1908, while visiting Pittsburgh, Pennsylvania, and was interred in Elmira's Woodlawn Cemetery.

References

1844 births
1908 deaths
People from Lodi, New York
Politicians from Elmira, New York
People from Chemung County, New York
Republican Party members of the United States House of Representatives from New York (state)
19th-century American politicians